Anthracia is a genus of moths of the family Noctuidae. The genus was erected by Jacob Hübner in 1823.

Species
 Anthracia ephialtes (Hübner, [1822])
 Anthracia eriopoda (Herrich-Schäffer, 1851)
 Anthracia sublimbatus (Püngeler, 1900)
 Anthracia submarginata (Bang-Haas, 1927)
 Anthracia subsignatus (Draudt, 1950)
 Anthracia turcomanica (Christoph, 1893)

References

Acronictinae